Steel is a superhero appearing in comic books published by DC Comics. He is a genius engineer who built a mechanized suit of armor that mirrors Superman's powers, and initially sought to replace him after he was killed by Doomsday. After Superman was resurrected, he accepted Steel as an ally. His real name is John Henry Irons and he wields a sledgehammer—this is a reference to the mythical railroad worker John Henry. He has a niece named Natasha Irons who is also a superhero in a similar mechanized suit of armour.

The character was portrayed by Shaquille O'Neal in the 1997 film adaptation of the same name. Wolé Parks portrays the character in the television series Superman & Lois.

Publication history
First appearing in The Adventures of Superman #500 (June 1993), he is the second character known as Steel and was created by Louise Simonson and artist Jon Bogdanove. Aspects of the character are clearly inspired by the African American folk hero John Henry, as well as Superman.

Fictional character biography

The Death of Superman

Doctor John Henry Irons was a brilliant weapons engineer for AmerTek Industries, who eventually became disgusted when the BG-60, a powerful man-portable energy cannon he had designed, fell into the wrong hands and was used to kill innocent people. As the company would have coerced him to retain his services, John faked his death, and eventually came to Metropolis. His own life was saved by none other than Superman. When John Irons asked how he could show his gratitude, Superman told him to "live a life worth saving". During Superman's fatal battle against Doomsday, Irons, who was working in construction at the time, attempted to help Superman fight the deadly menace by picking up a sledgehammer, but was buried in rubble amidst the devastation. Shortly after Superman's death, he finally awoke and crawled from the wreckage, confused and saying, "Gotta stop Doomsday!"

He recovered, but to discover that the gangs in inner-city Metropolis (now unopposed by Superman) were fighting a devastating gang war using BG-80 Toastmasters, an upgraded version of his earlier AmerTek design. Irons created and donned a suit of powered armor in Superman's memory to stop the war, as well as the weapons, which were being distributed by Dr. Angora Lapin (also known as the White Rabbit), a former partner and lover during his time at AmerTek Industries.

The "Reign of the Supermen" story arc saw the rise of four "Supermen" who were differentiated from each other with nicknames previously applied to Superman; Irons was referred to as the "Man of Steel", which was later shortened to "Steel" by Superman himself.

Although Steel never claimed to be the "true Superman", Lois Lane seriously considered the possibility that he was a walk-in—someone who was now inhabited by Superman's soul. Lois met all four "Supermen" that appeared after the apparent death of Superman, and while she never concluded that any of them was the one true Superman, she evinced less skepticism of Steel than she did of the others.

Steel series
Steel was spun off into a solo series, written by co-creator Louise Simonson and later by Christopher Priest, from 1994 to 1998.

The series began by having Steel leave Metropolis and return home to Washington, D.C., revealing that it had been five years since he had left. He erroneously believed that his old employers, AmerTek, would no longer be interested in him. This turned out to be false when they attacked his home. Between this attack and his knowledge that the Toastmasters were now being used on the streets of D.C., he re-forged his armor (it was now stronger than ever); he began his crusade against AmerTek, which he correctly knew was responsible for leaking the weapons onto the street. Steel decided not to use the "S" emblem, however, since he felt that his battle might take him outside the law.

Steel's family was introduced in this series: his grandparents, Butter and Bess, his sister-in-law Blondell, and her five children: Jemahl, Natasha, Paco, Tyke, and Darlene (the latter two being foster children).

Steel's early adventures pitted him against AmerTek and against the gangs that were using his weapons. His nephew, Jemahl, was involved in one of the gangs, which he thought offered him protection. He was proven wrong, however, when the gangs turned against him to get to Steel. Tyke was paralyzed by a bullet meant for Jemahl and Blondell was assaulted. Steel eventually took down AmerTek and the gangs, and focused on who was helping AmerTek distribute the weapons. This led him to track down a group called Black Ops, led by the villain Hazard.

During this time Steel had found romance with Physician Amanda Quick who treated his nephew Jemahl Irons (who was the brother to Natasha Irons), when he got hooked on the superpowered drug "Tar". She returned John's feelings for her. He shared his identity and adventures with her growing close together and falling in love. 

Steel briefly joined up with Maxima, who was still on Earth at the time and working with the Justice League, to help her with an alien warlord named De'cine. During this time, Steel developed the ability to teleport his armor onto and off of himself. At first, it appeared purely by reflex (whenever he was in mortal danger) but he soon began to better control it, although he had no idea how it happened.

Steel continued his battle against Hazard's Black Ops and against the return of the White Rabbit. A bounty hunter named Chindi attempted to take down Steel, but after realizing Hazard was experimenting with children, he ended up as an ally of Irons. He was called away from Earth as part of the Superman "Rescue Squad" when Superman was put on trial for the destruction of Krypton.

Tragedy would strike the Irons family upon his return from space. Tyke, frustrated and angry over his handicap, revealed Irons' true identity to men working with Hazard. Hazard unleashed a cyborg named Hardwire, who opened fire on the Irons family. Most of them received minor injuries, though Butter was seriously wounded. Child protective services came to reclaim Tyke and Darlene. Tyke was later shown to end up in the custody of Hazard. Hardwire battled Steel at the Washington Monument, resulting in Hardwire's suicide. Steel had to send his armor away to save his life—this resulted in his secret identity being revealed to the world at large. Steel was then taken by Hazard, but managed to escape. Steel retrieved an anti-matter weapon called the Annihilator, which he had designed and hidden years before, for his showdown with Hazard. He also learned at this point that he could teleport himself, not just his armor. He destroyed Hazard and his lair, and apparently killed three young soldiers of Hazard in the battle.

Once Steel's identity was out, his family had no peace. They were harassed by neighbors and mobs. Then they were attacked by Doctor Polaris, the Parasite, and others. John Henry's beloved grandmother, Bess, was killed and the family was forced to go into hiding, relocated by a friend of Steel's called Double.

Steel learned that the three Black Ops agents were not truly killed. They briefly joined him in battling a monstrous, animated form of his armor that attacked him. Steel speculated that the armor came alive because of his own guilt and the strange teleportation effects. He managed to banish the monster and recall his true armor.

The title received a shakeup when Christopher Priest became the lead writer in issue #34. Steel relocated to Jersey City, New Jersey with Natasha and began to work at Garden State Medical Center. He built a new suit of armor that was significantly less powerful than the previous one (but featured the return of an Kryptonian peace symbol on his shield on it). While in Jersey City, he clashed with Dennis Samuel Ellis, a resident at Garden State Medical and rival for the affections of another colleague, Amanda Quick. Hospital administrator and gang leader Arthur Villain (pronounced "Will-hane") recruited Ellis to become his personal bodyguard. Given a suit with several hidden weapons, Ellis adopted the name "Skorpio" and became a recurring nemesis for Steel. Eventually Steel was reunited with his brother Clay, a hitman whom everyone assumed had been killed. Clay assumed the alias "Crash" and managed to acquire a pair of Steel's flight boots before turning himself in so that he could save his daughter Natasha when she needed a blood transfusion. The series was canceled after issue #52, which featured Steel running the hospital after the unmasking of its previous coordinator, Villain.

Worlds Collide
During the Worlds Collide crossover series between DC and Milestone Media, Steel encountered his Milestone counterpart Hardware. Each hero questioned the other's motivations, Steel believing Hardware to be too rebellious and Hardware believing Steel to be too trusting and naive.

JLA and the Men of Steel
Around the time the Steel series was cancelled, Steel was recruited as a member of the Justice League, due to Batman's concern that the League was already top-heavy in brawn and required more thinkers. During his time in the League, Steel played a crucial role in the defeat of villains such as Prometheus and the Queen Bee. He even served as the leader of the reserve team—consisting of the Huntress, Big Barda, Plastic Man, and Zauriel—left in the present during the DC One Million crisis. Following the battle against Mageddon, he ceased to serve as a full-time member of the League, although he stayed on as a supporting member for quite some time. He also became a regular member in the Superman titles, having relocated with Nat to Metropolis to run his own workshop there, called "Steelworks." He also revealed at this time that he had known Superman's identity for some time. The two became partners of a sort, and John Henry helped Superman build a new Fortress of Solitude, although he maintained some contacts with the Justice League, as shown when he was able to contact Batman to help Superman find Lois Lane after she had been abducted by the Parasite.

Steel retired from active duty during the Imperiex War after he was injured while wearing the Entropy Aegis, an alien armor created on the evil planet Apokolips; it nearly consumed his "soul" after he was taken by the Black Racer while attempting to release Doomsday and use him against Imperiex. Superman eventually confronted Darkseid in single combat with the aid of the rest of the Superman family to keep Darkseid's other forces delayed, requesting only that Darkseid release Irons from the Entropy Aegis after his defeat in exchange for him never sharing the results of this battle with anyone, although they had to rush Irons back to Earth for urgent medical attention, as he was restored in the same physical state he had been in when he was placed in the armor, and it was speculated that the injuries would prevent him ever becoming Steel again.

Retirement
During his retirement, Irons made a suit of armor for his niece Natasha, who became the new Steel. Although he was no longer actively fighting crime, he remained an important ally of Superman. He unintentionally usurped the position of Emil Hamilton as Superman's technology guru, one of several developments that led to the emergence of Ruin.

52

John Henry Irons donned his armor once more in the wake of the Battle of Metropolis during Infinite Crisis. Along with most of Earth's united heroes, Steel helped defeat the Secret Society of Super Villains in Metropolis, but became bitter with life and a perceived narcissism within Earth's superhero community. After the disaster, John baited Natasha into an argument in which he prevented her from leaving Metropolis to join the Teen Titans. Irons refused to let her go and ordered her to continue collecting all the debris in the city, culminating in him destroying her armor in spite.

He later identified a recently discovered corpse as that of a Lex Luthor from a parallel universe, Alexander Luthor, Jr., exonerating the real Lex Luthor from all of his recent crimes.

A week later, at his Steelworks facilities, John Henry appeared to be hallucinating due to the effects of an unknown metabolic toxin. His flesh seemed to be in the middle of transforming into metal just before the lab exploded.

Three days later, Steel, again wearing his armor, was called in by Doctor Mid-Nite to help him with the wounded heroes returned from space after the Crisis. He used Pseudocytes to aid in Mal Duncan's recovery.

With the help of Kala Avasti from S.T.A.R. Labs, Irons learned that he had been injected with a small dosage of Lex Luthor's new  exo-gene therapy, causing his skin to mutate into stainless steel and back again. He returned to Steelworks to find Natasha attempting, and failing, to build a new suit. Unaware of the truth, she accused him of hypocrisy for accepting Lex's exo-gene treatment.

Three days and two nights later, Irons appeared, transformed into a man of living steel, at a party held by Lex Luthor. In a rage, he attacked Luthor, demanding to see Natasha and threatening or endangering anyone who got in his way. However, Natasha herself soon appeared, to stop John before he could kill Luthor. Natasha then single-handedly beat the enraged John until he came to his senses. He admitted that Natasha was right to stop him from killing Luthor, but maintained that he was right, too. He then asked Natasha to "give it up, come home". Natasha responded by punching John repeatedly and sending him flying into the Metropolis bay.

He reappeared several weeks later, having built a new suit of armor for Natasha, to make up for his behavior toward her, but had an emotional breakdown on realizing that it was too late to make amends.

He later returned to active duty saving lives, and discovered from Kala that the exo-gene therapy allowed Luthor to take away any powers he had given. He then shared his suspicions with the Teen Titans and a former test subject who had had his powers stripped away.

Investigating the Everyman Project on Thanksgiving along with Doctor Mid-Nite, Beast Boy/Changeling, and Kala, John discovered that his metal skin was peeling off and realized that the exo-gene therapy granted powers only for a limited time before they disappear completely.

In 52 Week 40, after Natasha's capture by Luthor, Irons, in his full armor, led the Teen Titans—Raven(Daughter of Trigon, The lord of the Underworld) Beast Boy/Changeling, Aquagirl, and Offspring—in an open assault on LexCorp. After defeating armed robot guards and Infinity, Inc., Irons, with his armor destroyed, engaged Luthor in battle. But Luthor, having gained similar abilities to Superman's, thrashes Irons. Natasha used Irons' sledgehammer to create an electromagnetic pulse that shut down Luthor's exo-gene, and Irons defeated him.

In 52 Week 47, John and Natasha reestablished Steelworks.

Infinity, Inc.

Steel was one of the main characters of the Infinity Inc. (vol. 2) series, which debuted in September 2007. A year after the end of the Every-man Project. Natasha is living with her uncle John Henry Irons and is in psychotherapy along with Erik, who refers to it as "our national religion" and Gerome. Another long-term patient, teenager Dale Smith, attacks his therapist and realizes his powers as a psychic vampire. Smith takes the name "Kid Empty". Apparently, a side effect of the exo-gene therapy is that once the exo-gene itself is suppressed, the energies unleashed by the therapy remains, re-enabling the metagene in a different fashion. As a result, Natasha finds herself turning to a mist-like substance, McKenna gains the ability to duplicate himself, and Storm gains a powerhouse, overconfident, female alter-ego. The group gains new members in Mercy Graves and Lucia, an Every-man subject who can psychically inflict pain on others. In issue #8, the team gains official costumes and code names, and go on their first mission.

Upon the much solicited ending for the series, the Infinitors are kidnapped by the Dark Side Club, as due to the exo-gene therapy, they are unpredictable and undetectable by Apokoliptan technology, and a wild card in the upcoming Final Crisis. Irons vows to scour the Earth for his niece.

In recent months, Irons has been working with Bruce Wayne/Batman, Zatanna, Mister Miracle, the Metal Men, and assorted other technical geniuses in creating a new body for the Red Tornado. Unfortunately, the Amazo program infected the new body. Working together, Wayne and Irons used the Justice League of America's teleportation doorways to send Amazo (an android with the power to use other people's powers) into a red sun, after which they completed a new body for the Red Tornado (an android with the power to make gusts of wind come out of his arms and torso).

When the Clock King takes over the Dark Side Club from Darkseid, he "inherits" the imprisoned Infinitors, so, when the Dark Side Club is finally destroyed, Miss Martian sends a "brain mail" to Irons, who comes to free his niece, and finally reunites with her.

Superman
John Henry Irons has made multiple appearances in the regular Superman series by James Robinson. He is attacked by the villain Atlas and rendered comatose. While in the hospital, his technology is used to keep the damage to Metropolis from being repaired. He plays a part in the War of the Supermen event, where he helps Superboy, the Guardian(James Harper), and Natasha bring down Sam Lane's conspiracy. He has a rematch with Atlas, whom he defeats.

Steel later appeared as one of the former JLA members called to Washington D.C. to help pierce a massive energy dome that had encapsulated the city. After a series of failed attempts to pierce the dome, Steel suggests to Superman that it may be too powerful for the heroes to destroy.

Reign of Doomsday

In January 2011, Steel featured in a one-shot comic, written by Doctor Who novelist Steve Lyons. Sean Chen was initially announced as the artist, but due to scheduling problems, Ed Benes took over the art duties. Steel finds himself the only person who can defend Metropolis from an attack by Doomsday. During the battle, Doomsday inexplicably develops metallic armor and the power of flight, countering Steel's own abilities. Steel attempts to immobilize Doomsday with nanites, but he quickly overcomes them, and badly beats him. Doomsday then picks up Steel's prone form and flies off with him. When Steel awakens to find himself in a dimensional prison with Superboy, Supergirl, the Eradicator, and Hank Henshaw/the Cyborg Superman, all of whom have been captured by Doomsday, he speculates that Henshaw was included in the group to keep them divided and prevent them working together to find a way of escaping. Their subsequent exploration of their prison reveals that they were actually captured by clones of Doomsday created by Lex Luthor to distract Earth's heroes while he sought the power of the Black Lantern Ring (the Lantern of Death), each Doomsday clone designed to eliminate the Superman it was sent after.

The New 52
In September 2011, The New 52 rebooted DC's continuity. In this new timeline, John Henry Irons first appears in Grant Morrison's Action Comics as a young scientist working on the government's "Steel Soldier" program. He retaliates after seeing the mistreatment of Superman by Lex Luthor (who was under the command of General Sam Lane to torture him). Irons immediately quits. When John Corben goes on a rampage after donning the government's "Metal 0" suit, John Henry aids Superman in fighting him off by using his own prototype armor for the first time, uploading a virus into the Metal 0 suit that he designed specifically to shut it down in the event of the user going rogue.

John Henry also shows up in Animal Man during the Rotworld crossover, where he assists Buddy Baker when the world has been overrun by The Rot, the elemental force of decay.

Brainiac used Doomsday to infect Superman and distract the world as the Cyborg Superman and himself tried to steal the minds of every person on Earth. As that transpires Steel teams up with Lana Lang to help Superman and stop Brainiac. Afterwards Lana and John began to date.

Steel is recruited when Warworld appears above the Earth. He is partnered with Batgirl and secretly inserted onto the planet to neutralize its main threat, a planet-destroying gun. They manage to do so with moments to spare.

DC Rebirth
In 2016, DC Comics implemented another relaunch of its books called "DC Rebirth", which restored its continuity to a form much as it was prior to "The New 52". Steel now currently protects Metropolis alongside Lana Lang where he supports her both as a boyfriend and a partner in crime-fighting. With his niece, Natasha Irons and Lana make up Team Steel. When Lana's powers nearly killed her, John was there to watch over her, seeking out Superman to help save her. When she recovers, it seemed her powers were gone. He, Lana, and Natasha spend time in Smallville while she tries to cope, but she pushes him away in anger. When she deals with the loss, the three return to the city, where they create a test chamber that they believed could restore Lana's powers by pushing her through her worst fears and doubts. The chamber accomplished the task, and it was discovered that the Insect Queen suit Natasha built for her stored her powers inside the last time she used it. 

Later, John and Natasha are seen at Lana's apartment, watching news about a sighting of Skyhook, the meta criminal that kidnapped Zeke, John's nephew. The two immediately prepare to go to the police for information, but Lana reveals she went ahead alone, upsetting them. The next day, John is preparing to hunt down Skyhook, despite Lana's attempts to talk him out of it. However, John's brother Crash finds him first, hoping to avenge his son. John and Natasha arrive not long after Lana reaches the scene. Rather that target Skyhook, the two forsake their revenge to save Crash, entrusting their quarry to Superwoman, who defeats him. 

The pages of "The New Golden Age" (which took place after "Flashpoint Beyond") revealed that Steel has a great-uncle who was also called John Henry Irons and had operated as a racial freedom fighter inspired by John Henry called John Henry Jr. after he had witnessed the Ku Klux Klan murder John Henry.

Powers and abilities
John Henry Irons is an engineer, and a natural athlete who frequently displays an impressive degree of strength. In addition, he wears a suit of powered armor which grants him flight, enhanced strength, and endurance. Steel modified his suit many times through his career. The initial "Man of Steel" design was armed with a wrist-mounted rivet gun and the sledgehammer (like the one used by his namesake John Henry) that was ubiquitous for most of his designs. The original design on his breastplate featured a metal version of Superman's "S" insignia in tribute to the (temporarily) deceased hero, which Irons removed after the return of Superman. Two later armor designs incorporated a similar, but different, "S" symbol. A large hammer is also a key weapon in the suit's arsenal. His most current "smart hammer" hits harder the farther it is thrown, is capable of independent flight, and has an on-board computer guidance and analysis system capable of detecting a target's stress points.

When he wore the Entropy Aegis, he had god-like strength and durability and could enlarge himself to giant size. He also had the ability of flight due to energy wings, could travel through time and space at will, and could fire blasts of energy that would reduce a target to its composite elements. However, the Aegis made him very violent and was slowly erasing his soul.

During the 52 event, John Henry Irons was altered by the Everyman Project and had become composed of stainless steel due to Lex Luthor tampering with John's DNA without John's consent. Steel's strength and durability were now on a superhuman level. In addition, he could generate enough heat to turn metal fluid (including his own body, which he can then drip off of himself in small amounts). In 52 Week 29, the metal skin peeled off completely, leaving him, again, a normal human. He has since returned to using powered armor of a design similar to his original "Man of Steel" armor.

Enemies

Steel had his own enemies that he fought in his comic series:

 Alter - A detective that developed the ability to turn into a hulking monster with super-strength, claws, and invulnerability. The side-effect left him with a multiple personality disorder.
 Amalgam - A criminal with a cybernetic arm.
 Amertek Industries - An industrial military firm that John Henry Irons used to work for.
 Thomas Weston - A colonel and weapons developer who runs Amertek Industries.
 Arthur Villain - A surgeon and administrator at Garden Valley Medical Center.
 Ba'ad - A cyborg mercenary from the planet Kreno.
 Black Ops - A criminal organization.
 Hazard - Manuel Cabral is the cybernetic-enhanced head of Rainforest Technologies who is the leader of Black Ops.
 Hardsell - A member of Black Ops with invulnerability and super-strength.
 Hotspot - A pyrokinetic member of Black Ops who also possesses flight and intangibility.
 Mainline - A member of Black Ops with energy projection, flight, and super-speed.
 Quake - A member of Black Ops who can perform shock waves.
 Shellshock - A female member of Black Ops with super-strength.
 Split - A member of Black Ops with teleportation.
 Blockbuster II - A super-strong crime boss.
 Central Avenue Skulls - A street gang that operated on Central Avenue and wield Toastmaster weapons.
 Cowboy - The leader of the Central Avenue Skulls.
 Chindi - Russell Wolf is a man whose suit enables him to possess super-strength, enhanced durability, flight, and force field projection.
 Crash - Clay Irons is the brother of John Henry Irons.
 Doctor Polaris - A magnetic supervillain.
 East Street Skulls - A street gang that operated on Central Avenue who are rivals of the Central Avenue Skulls and rely on the drug Tar to enhance their strengths.
 Parasite - An energy-draining supervillain.
 Plasmus - A protoplasmic supervillain.
 Queen Tech'tra - The ruler of the Krenon Empire.
 Skorpio - A physician who became the bodyguard of Arthur Villain and wears a special suit.
 White Rabbit - A female arms dealer.
 Bug II - A minion of White Rabbit who can create a distortion field.
 Default - A minion of White Rabbit who can teleport.
 Digit - A size-shifting minion of White Rabbit.
 Firebomb - A minion of White Rabbit with pyrokinesis and intangibility. Because he has no physical body, Firebomb wears a special suit to interact physically with his surroundings.
 Gearhead - A minion of White Rabbit.
 Jitter - A minion of White Rabbit who can create a circular portal from one place to another.
 Worm - A minion of White Rabbit who can create virtual doppelgängers that would fade away to him if they were killed.

Other versions

DC: The New Frontier
In the DC Comics miniseries DC: The New Frontier, a black man, John Wilson, takes on the name "John Henry" while donning a black hood secured by a hangman's noose and produces a sledge hammer in an attempt to avenge his family, who were murdered by the KKK. He kills two Klansmen and injures many more before being injured; while hiding in a barn he is discovered by a young white girl. He is then killed by the Klansmen. John Henry Irons is seen in the epilogue reading near John Henry's gravestone. This serves to further emotionally connect the hero Steel and his namesake to the folk hero.

Kingdom Come
In the events of the Elseworlds' Kingdom Come series, Steel is seen to have joined Batman's faction, due to Superman's self-imposed exile at the hands of Magog. His suit now owes its darker more black stylings to Batman, rather than Superman, and he carries a Bat-shaped axe rather than his hammer. Steel was later killed during the final battle between the League, the Gulag metahuman rogues and Batman's army by the nuclear warhead launched by the UN.

"Hyper-Tension"
In the story "Hyper-Tension", in the comic Superboy (vol. 3) #62, it shows a Steel in an alternate reality who joins Black Zero, an alternate adult version of Superboy (Kon-El) in a war for clone rights.

"Steel: Crucible of Freedom"
In an Elseworlds tale featured in Steel Annual #1, "Steel: Crucible of Freedom", John Henry is a slave and blacksmith who builds a suit of armor for his master to fight in the Civil War. However, as his master will not sit for measurements, John is forced to fit the suit to himself, and uses it to lead the slaves in a revolt when his infant son and the children of the other slaves drown due to the carelessness of the Overseer. The story's epilogue tells how, after years spent fighting for his fellow slaves' freedom and traveling the expanding United States, this John Henry goes on to become the "steel drivin' man" of American folklore.

Superman vs. the Terminator: Death to the Future
In the crossover Superman vs. the Terminator: Death to the Future, Superman was temporarily transferred into the future of the Terminator universe, where he encountered an older version of Steel who fought alongside John Connor's resistance against Skynet as one of the last costumed heroes, noting that many heroes died in Skynet's attack and he operated on his own until meeting the Resistance. Although old by this point, Steel remained as intelligent as ever, having fitted his hammer with a voice-activation and anti-gravity unit that allowed him to call his hammer to him in the event he was ever captured, using this ability when he and Superman are briefly captured by Skynet.

JLA/Avengers
In the JLA/Avengers crossover, Steel plays a minor role, developing a battery pack for the Flash so that he has access to his powers while in the Marvel Universe; since the Speed Force does not exist in the Marvel Universe, Steel's device allows Wally to "absorb" Speed Force energy while he runs in the DC Universe that he can use when in the Marvel Universe. Steel later appears on Paradise Island alongside the Flash to stop the Vision, Quicksilver, and the Scarlet Witch from acquiring the Evil Eye of Avalon. He then participates in the fight against Krona's minions in the final battle, fighting Atlanteans alongside Namor, Beast, Plastic Man, and Maxima.

In other media

Television

 John Henry Irons / Steel appears in series set in the DC Animated Universe (DCAU). This version lacks his comics counterpart's shield and cape and wields wrist-mounted lasers instead of rivet guns.
 He first appears in Superman: The Animated Series, voiced by Michael Dorn. Introduced in the episode "Prototype", he works as a designer for LexCorp and is tasked with creating prototype powered armor for the Metropolis Police Department's Special Crimes Unit. However, the suit's neural interface system has adverse psychological effects on its user, Sgt. Corey Mills. Encouraged by Superman, Irons works to perfect the suit with the help of his niece Natasha. In the episode "Heavy Metal", having been fired from LexCorp, he becomes the superhero Steel and helps Superman fight Metallo.
 Steel appears in Justice League Unlimited, voiced by Phil LaMarr. As of this series, he became a member of the expanded Justice League.
 John Henry Irons / Steel appears in Young Justice: Outsiders, voiced by Zeno Robinson. This version is a member of the Justice League.
 An alternate universe incarnation of John Henry Irons appears in Superman & Lois, portrayed by Wolé Parks. Introduced as "Captain Luthor", this version is from an unidentified alternate Earth that was ravaged by an army of evil Kryptonians engineered by his Earth's Morgan Edge and led by Superman. Additionally, Irons was married to his Earth's Lois Lane and has a daughter named Natalie. After Lane exposed the Kryptonians' weakness to Kryptonite on the news, she was killed by Superman. In response, Irons and Natalie built a suit of armor, incorporated an A.I. (voiced by Daisy Tormé) he took from his Earth's Lex Luthor, and armed it with a kinetic hammer. As he was unable to reprogram its recognition protocols, Irons was forced to go by "Captain Luthor". While testing a new weapon that could potentially kill Superman, Irons is transported to the "prime" Smallville, witnesses its Superman, and begins hunting him, believing he will inevitably turn evil. Along the way, Irons encounters the "prime" Lane and launches an investigation into her version of Edge. Irons later uses Lane to arrange a meeting with Superman and beats him after weakening him with red solar flares. Meanwhile, having obtained Irons' fingerprints to see if he was related to Luthor, Lane deduces Irons' identity and joins forces with her sons, Jonathan and Jordan, to save Superman while the Department of Defense (DOD) take Irons into custody. He is later released after Lane convinces him to spare Superman when the DOD facility is attacked by one of Edge's Kryptonians. Irons leaves Smallville to look for the "prime" version of his sister, but returns when Lane contacts him after Edge, revealed to be Superman's half-brother Tal-Rho, has Superman's mind taken over by General Zod. After Lane reveals that Superman is her husband Clark Kent, Irons abandons his original plan of killing him and successfully convinces him to expel Zod from his mind. He then teams up with Superman to capture Tal-Rho and his assistant Leslie Larr. As a sign of their new partnership, Superman entrusts the DOD's Kryptonite weaponry to Irons in case he turns evil again. As Irons is about to leave Smallville, Natalie crash-lands at the Kent farm in a vessel. In the second season, Irons helps Natalie adjust to the new Earth to no avail until Lane talks to Natalie before she and Irons move in with the Kent family.
 A picture of Parks is used to represent the "prime" version of Irons, who is stated to have been a specialist in counterinsurgency and was killed in action years prior.

Film
 John Henry Irons / Steel appears in a self-titled film, with Shaquille O'Neal in the title role. The film was originally meant to be a spin-off of a new Superman film based on "The Death of Superman" storyline, which first introduced Irons as Steel in the comics. However, the project ultimately became divorced from the Superman mythos and languished in development hell, causing it to be moved forward without the film it was meant be attached to.
 A young John Henry Irons makes a cameo appearance in Justice League: The New Frontier.
 John Henry Irons appears in films set in the DC Animated Movie Universe (DCAMU).
 He first appears in Justice League: Throne of Atlantis, voiced by Khary Payton.
 He next appears in The Death of Superman, voiced by Cress Williams. By this time, he has become a S.T.A.R. Labs scientist and prepares a suit of armor in response to the eponymous event.
 Irons also appears in Reign of the Supermen, voiced again by Cress Williams. He adopts the name "Steel" due to the events of the previous film and comes into contact with three other "Supermen".
 Irons makes a non-speaking appearance in Justice League Dark: Apokolips War.
 An alternate universe incarnation of John Henry Irons appears in Justice League: Gods and Monsters, voiced again by Khary Payton. This version is a scientist involved in LexCorp's "Project Fair Play", which is meant to counter their universe's Justice League. Irons and the other scientists involved meet at Karen Beecher's house to discuss the loss of three of their fellow scientists until they are all attacked and killed by the Metal Men.
 Steel makes a non-speaking cameo appearance in Teen Titans Go! To the Movies.

Video games
 Steel appears as a playable character in The Death and Return of Superman.
 Steel appears in Superman: The Man of Steel, voiced by Billy Brown.
 Steel appears in DC Universe Online, voiced by Ken Thomas.
 Steel appears as a playable character in DC Legends.

Miscellaneous
 British radio producer Dirk Maggs produced a Superman radio series for BBC Radio 5 in the 1990s. When "The Death of Superman" story arc happened in the comics, Maggs presented a very faithful, albeit pared down version of the tale, which featured Stuart Milligan as Clark Kent / Superman, Lorelei King as Lois Lane, William Hootkins as Lex Luthor, and Leon Hebert as John Henry Irons. The story arc was packaged for sale on cassette and CD as Superman: Doomsday and Beyond in the UK and as Superman Lives! in the USA.
 The DCAU version of Steel makes an appearance in issue #2 of the Justice League Unlimited tie-in comic book.
 An alternate universe incarnation of Steel was originally slated to appear in season two of Justice League: Gods and Monsters Chronicles before it was cancelled.

References

External links
 
Steel at Don Markstein's Toonopedia. Archived from the original on December 7, 2017.
 Steel's secret origin on DC Comics.com
 The Official 52 Website

 
Characters created by Louise Simonson
DC Comics adapted into films
Comics by Louise Simonson
Comics characters introduced in 1993
DC Comics characters with superhuman senses
DC Comics characters with superhuman strength
DC Comics characters who are shapeshifters
DC Comics cyborgs
DC Comics male superheroes
DC Comics metahumans
DC Comics scientists
African-American superheroes
Fictional characters from Washington, D.C.
Fictional characters with X-ray vision
Fictional characters with nuclear or radiation abilities
Fictional characters with energy-manipulation abilities
Fictional characters with fire or heat abilities
Fictional construction workers
Fictional hammer fighters
Fictional physicians
Fictional engineers
Fictional inventors
Fictional mechanics
Fictional soldiers
DC Comics film characters
Superman characters